Battle of Szkłów or battle of Shkloŭ may refer to:
 Battle of Szkłów (1654)
 Battle of Szkłów (1664)